Wythenshawe Amateurs Football Club is a football club based in Wythenshawe, Greater Manchester, England.

History
The club was established in 1946 by Reg Gauntlet under the name Wythenshawe Lads Club, and joined the Manchester Federation of Lads' Clubs League. In 1949 the players had become too old for the league, resulting in the club developing an adult side that entered the South Manchester and Wythenshawe League. After several promotions, they were Division One champions in 1952–53. The club then joined the Altrincham & District League, in which they played for a single season before switching to Division 3A of the Lancashire & Cheshire League.

Wythenshawe's first season in the Lancashire & Cheshire League saw them win the Hellawell Shield and the Division 3A title, resulting in promotion to Division Three. The following season saw the club finish second in Division Three and earn promotion to Division Two, as well as reaching the final of the Altrincham FA's Whitaker Cup, holding Manchester United to a 1–1 draw after extra time, resulting in the cup being shared. In 1956–57 the club secured a third successive promotion after winning the Division Two title. After becoming members of Division One, the club won the league's Rhodes Cup in 1957–58 and 1960–61, before becoming Division One champions in 1961–62.

Wythenshawe won the Rhodes Cup again in 1971–72, after which they moved up to Division One of the Manchester League. The club were Division One champions at the first attempt, earning promotion to the Premier Division. In 1975–76 they won the Lancashire Amateur Cup. The club were Premier Division runners-up in 1979–80 and 1984–85, and won the Gilgryst Cup in 1985–86 and 1986–87. The 1989–90 season saw the club win a treble, finishing as Premier Division champions and winning both the Lancashire Amateur Cup and the Gilgryst Cup.

Wythenshawe were Premier Division runners-up in 1991–92, before winning the league again in 1992–93 and finishing as runners-up the following season. They won the Lancashire Amateur Cup again in 1995–96, and the Gilgryst cup in 1998–99, 2000–01 and 2008–09.  In the league, they finished as runners-up six times between 2000 and 2017. After finishing as runners-up and winning the Gilgryst Cup again in 2017–18, the club were accepted into Division One South of the North West Counties League.

Ground
The club initially played at the Cleveland Playing Fields, before moving to Wythenshawe Park in 1949. In 1958 they relocated to the Christie Playing Fields, where they played until moving to the Federation of Lads' Club Ground in nearby Chorlton in 1961. This was later renamed the Harry Dalton playing fields, Dalton having been in charge of the club when they became an adult side. In 1983 they relocated to Wythenshawe Cricket Club's Longley Lane ground. After several years of fundraising, the club built a new ground, Hollyhedge Park, which opened on 30 September 2017 with a 1–1 draw with Hindsford .

Honours
Manchester League
Premier Division champions 1989–90, 1992–93
Division One champions 1972–73
Gilgryst Cup winners 1985–86, 1986–87, 1989–90, 1998–99, 2000–01, 2008–09, 2017–18
Norman Noden Memorial Invitation Cup winners 2008–09
Lancashire & Cheshire League
Division One champions 1961–62
Division Two champions 1956–57
Division 3A champions 1954–55
Rhodes Cup winners 1957–58, 1960–61, 1971–72
Hellawell Shield winners 1954–55
South Manchester and Wythenshawe League
Division One champions 1952–53
Whitaker Cup
Winners 1955–56 (joint)

Records
Best FA Cup performance: Preliminary round, 2020–21
Best FA Amateur Cup performance: Third qualifying round, 1972–73
Best FA Vase performance: Fifth round, 1984–85
Record attendance: 652 vs West Didsbury & Chorlton, North West Counties League Division One South, 5 March 2022
Biggest win: 10–1 vs AFC Monton, Manchester League Premier Division, 18 November 2017; 9–0 vs St Martins, North West Counties League Division One South, 26 February 2022
Heaviest defeat: 6–0 vs Avro, Manchester League Premier Division, 25 February 2012; 6–0 vs Ashton Athletic, North West Counties League Cup, 7 December 2019

References

External links
Official website

Football clubs in England
Football clubs in Manchester
Association football clubs established in 1946
1946 establishments in England
Wythenshawe
Manchester Football League
North West Counties Football League clubs
Fan-owned football clubs in England